Umakishore Ramachandran  from the Georgia Institute of Technology School of Computer Science was named Fellow of the Institute of Electrical and Electronics Engineers (IEEE) in 2014 for contributions to programming idioms for parallel and distributed systems and design of scalable shared memory systems.

References 

Fellow Members of the IEEE
Living people
Year of birth missing (living people)
American electrical engineers